War is a live album by Bolt Thrower recorded in Manchester 1992, on an 8-track tape. It was originally recorded by the band members in order to have some of their own live recordings for posterity. Later on Earache Records wanted to release a special edition of the ...For Victory album, thus it was packed with that album in 1994 in a limited 2CD package; i.e., they just replaced the box with a 2CD box and added the second disc. The album is sometimes known or listed as Live War.

The promo edition was labeled Mosh 124, which is a mistake, since according to the official Earache catalogue Mosh 124 is a Fudge Tunnel album.

Track listing

Personnel
 Karl Willetts - vocals
 Gavin Ward - guitars
 Barry Thomson - guitars
 Andrew Whale - drums
 Jo Bench - Bass guitar

Bolt Thrower albums
1994 live albums
Earache Records live albums